The following article presents a summary of the 1933 football (soccer) season in Brazil, which was the 32nd season of competitive football in the country.

Torneio Rio-São Paulo

Final Standings

Palestra Itália-SP declared as the Torneio Rio-São Paulo champions.

Campeonato Paulista

Final Standings

Palestra Itália-SP declared as the Campeonato Paulista champions.

State championship champions

Other competition champions

Brazil national team
The Brazil national football team did not play any matches in 1933.

References

 Brazilian competitions at RSSSF
 Brazil national team matches at RSSSF

 
Seasons in Brazilian football
Brazil